Sir Kenneth Octavius Hall  (born 24 April 1941) served as the governor-general of Jamaica from 16 February 2006 to 26 February 2009. He was Jamaica's fifth governor-general since independence in 1962.

Early life and education 
Hall was born in Lucea, Jamaica and attended Rusea's High School. Hall holds a Bachelor's degree in History, a post-graduate diploma in International Relations, and a PhD in History from Queen's University in Kingston, Ontario, Canada.

Career 
Prior to becoming Governor-General, he was a Pro-Vice Chancellor and Principal of the University of the West Indies, Mona Campus. Hall has served in several other positions including:
 Vice President of Academic Affairs and Faculty Dean - State University of New York at Old Westbury (1989-1994)
 Assistant Provost for Academic Programmes - State University of New York at Albany (1988-1989)
 Assistant Provost - State University of New York at Oswego (1982-1984)
 Faculty Research Associate - Syracuse University (1973-1984)
 Lecturer - University of the West Indies (1972-1973)

He lectured in history at the University of the West Indies and was Professor of History at the State University of New York (SUNY) at Oswego. He was also Adjunct Professor of Caribbean Studies at University at Albany, SUNY in Albany, New York, and Professor of American Studies at State University of New York at Old Westbury.

In 1994, Hall had entered the service of the Caribbean Community (CARICOM) as Deputy Secretary General. In 1996, he assumed the positions of Pro Vice Chancellor and Principal of the Mona Campus, UWI.

On 13 January 2009, it was announced by the Jamaica Information Service that Hall had resigned as Governor-General of Jamaica, citing health reasons. He was succeeded by Patrick Allen, President of the West Indies Union of Seventh-Day Adventists and Chairman of Northern Caribbean University in Jamaica.

Honours and awards 
He received the Order of Jamaica, a National Honour, in 2004. He was conferred with Jamaica's second highest national honour, the Order of the Nation, on the occasion of his swearing in. A year and eight months after being appointed Jamaica's fifth Governor-General, Hall was appointed GCMG on 6 November 2007, and received the insignia from Queen Elizabeth II at Buckingham Palace on 30 May 2008.

In 2008, Hall and Lady Rheima Hall received the Collar and Grand Cross of the Order of Civil Merit of Spain, respectively.

References

External links 
Official profile
Home page at The Integrationist Caribbean

University of the West Indies academics
Jamaican academics
Governors-General of Jamaica
Government of Jamaica
Jamaican knights
1941 births
Living people
Jamaican Knights Grand Cross of the Order of St Michael and St George
State University of New York at Oswego faculty
State University of New York at Old Westbury faculty
Members of the Order of Jamaica
Recipients of the Order of the Nation
Queen's University at Kingston alumni
University at Albany, SUNY faculty
Collars of the Order of Civil Merit